Ronald Bernard Jennison   was Archdeacon of the Riviera from 1982 to 1983.

Matthews was educated at Chichester Theological College and ordained in 1960. After a curacy in Thornaby-on-Tees at Tewkesbury Abbey he held incumbencies at Hull, Bridlington and Sewerby. He then served at Marseilles before his time as Archdeacon; and Finmere afterwards.

Notes

Archdeacons of the Riviera
20th-century English Anglican priests
Alumni of Chichester Theological College
Possibly living people
British expatriates in France